The Hospital Federation of France was founded in 1924 from the merger of the five inter-regional hospital unions.  It is a non-profit association established under the Association law of 1 July 1901.

The members include more than 1,000 public health establishments (hospitals) and as many medico-social structures (retirement homes and independent specialized shelters), ie almost all public sector health and social care institutions.

Its main aims are:
Promotion of the public hospital and medico-social establishments;
Information of professionals;
Representation of establishments.

It appoints representatives to:
the Higher Council of Hospitals,
the Higher Council of the Public Hospital Service,
the National and Regional Commissions of the Health and Social Organization,
the Caisse nationale de solidarité pour l'autonomie,
the National Advisory Council for People with Disabilities,
National Staff Retirement Fund, Social Work Management Committee, and
the National Association for Continuing Education of Hospital Staff.

It is also active at the international level. Guy Collet is the Strategy Advisor of the Federation.

References

External links 
 Official website

Hospitals in France